Peter Youngblood Hills (born 28 January 1978) is an Anglo-American actor. He is perhaps best known for his supporting role of Sgt. Darrell "Shifty" Powers in HBO’s World War II mini-series, Band of Brothers.

Early life
He was born in Johannesburg, to an American mother (raised in North East Tennessee, USA) and English father (who was raised in Lusaka, Zambia). Both Parents were trained as classical singers. His parents separated when he was a child and his father remarried his step mother; a lifetime choir master and music teacher. He has three half siblings from his mothers previous marriage. He lived most of his early life between America and the United Kingdom and at age 13 attended Mill Hill School, a boarding school in Mill Hill, North London and completed his education to sixth form in 1996.

Career
Peter Youngblood Hills has been a professional actor since 1996. He started off his career in acting with various music videos, TV commercials and theater before beginning a career in film. He has appeared in various films like The Beach and The Last of the Blonde Bombshells. His big break was when he appeared in Tom Hanks and Steven Spielberg’s Band of Brothers.

He also appeared in a 2002 film, AKA with his Band of Brothers co-star Matthew Leitch. In 2003, he starred as Steve Warson in  Michel Vaillant. In 2006, he starred in the Foyle's War Series 4 episode titled "Invasion". Hills had a brief cameo in The Wolf of Wall Street.

Leonardo DiCaprio asked him to do the stylized cinematography for his environmental documentary The 11th Hour. It focused on the conservation and preservation of Life.

Due to his role in "Band of Brothers" his interests and personal life became focused on 'the recovery from war' which led to a 12-year mentorship with Vietnam Veteran, Sensei and Interfaith Rev. Clifford Ishigaki.

Filmography

Film

Television

References

External links
 

1978 births
South African male film actors
American male television actors
South African people of English descent
South African people of American descent
American expatriates in South Africa
Living people
People educated at Mill Hill School
People from Johannesburg
20th-century English male actors
20th-century American male actors
21st-century American male actors
21st-century English male actors